Fawcett may refer to:

People
Fawcett (surname)

Places
Fawcett, Alberta, a hamlet in Alberta, Canada

Other uses
Fawcett City, a fictional DC Comics city 
Fawcett Publications, an American publishing company
Fawcett Comics, a division of Fawcett Publications
Fawcett Society, an organisation in the United Kingdom that campaigns for women's rights
Fawcett Stadium